Anne Elisabeth Elvebakk (born 10 May 1966, in Voss) is a former biathlete from Norway. She has received twelve World championship medals. In 1988 she won the biathlon world cup.

References
IBU Profile
World Champions Profile

1966 births
Living people
People from Voss
Norwegian female biathletes
Olympic biathletes of Norway
Biathletes at the 1992 Winter Olympics
Biathletes at the 1994 Winter Olympics
Biathlon World Championships medalists
Sportspeople from Vestland
20th-century Norwegian women